Rodney may refer to:

People
 Rodney (name)
 Rodney (wrestler), American professional wrestler

Places
Australia
 Electoral district of Rodney, a former electoral district in Victoria
 Rodney County, Queensland
Canada
 Rodney, Ontario, a village located within the township of West Elgin, Ontario
New Zealand
 Rodney District, a former territorial local authority district
 Rodney (local board area), a local government area
 Rodney Local Board, an Auckland Council local board
 Rodney Ward, an Auckland Council ward
 Rodney (New Zealand electorate), an electoral district containing most of Rodney District
United States
 Rodney, Iowa
 Rodney, Mississippi, a former city
 Rodney, Ohio
 Rodney, Wisconsin, a ghost town
 Rodney Village, Delaware
 Rodney Scout Reservation Delmarva Council, Northeast, Maryland

Other uses
 Rodney (TV series)
 Rodney boat, a type of boat used for fishing & shore transport in Newfoundland
 HMS Rodney, six ships of the British Royal Navy named after Admiral George Brydges Rodney

See also